A snow globe (also called a waterglobe, snowstorm, or snowdome) is a transparent sphere, traditionally made of glass, enclosing a miniaturized scene of some sort, often together with a model of a town, neighborhood, landscape or figure. The sphere also encloses the water in the globe; the water serves as the medium through which the "snow" falls. To activate the snow, the globe is shaken to churn up the white particles. The globe is then placed back in its position and the flakes fall down slowly through the water. Snow globes sometimes have a built-in music box that plays a song. Some snow globes  have a design around the outerbase for decoration. Snow globes are often used as a collectible item.

Historical 
At the end of the 19th century the Austrian Erwin Perzy, a producer of surgical instruments, invented the so-called Schneekugel (snow globe) and got the first patent for it.  Originally his goal was to develop an extra bright lightsource for use as a surgical lamp. As he tried to intensify the candlepower of a so-called Schusterkugel (a water-filled flask used to focus light since the Middle Ages) with particles made out of different materials for reflection purpose, the effect reminded him of snowfall. He then built his first scene globe with a model of the basilica of Mariazell. Because of the great demand for his snow globes, Perzy and his brother Ludwig opened a shop in Vienna, where the production continues until today as a family business exporting throughout the world. The material and methods used to make the particles for Perzy globes is a family production secret.

In the United States, the first snow globe-related patent was granted in 1927 to Joseph Garaja of Pittsburgh, Pennsylvania. In 1929, Garaja convinced Novelty Pool Ornaments to manufacture a fish version underwater.

In America, during the 1940s, snow globes were often used for advertising. In Europe, during the 1940s and 1950s, religious snow globes were common gifts for Roman Catholic children. Snow globes have appeared in a number of film scenes, the most famous of which is the opening of the 1941 classic Citizen Kane.

In the 1950s, the globes, which were previously made of glass, became available in plastic. Currently, there are many different types of snow globes available. These globes are produced by a number of countries and range from the mass-produced versions of Hong Kong and China to the finely crafted types still produced in Austria. Snow globes feature diverse scenes, ranging from the typical holiday souvenirs to more eclectic collectibles featuring Christmas scenes, Disney characters, popular icons, animals, military figures, historical scenes, etc.

Since 2000 fashion and luxury brands, such as Louis Vuitton, Ladurée, Sonia Rykiel, or Martin Margiela, got hold of the trend and grew fond of snow globes as collectible totems and emblems of their brand image. Such enthusiasm was reinforced by presence in numerous art collections of contemporary artists  Walter Martin & Paloma Muñoz (also known as Martin & Muñoz) who use snow globes as a medium, or museums who paid tribute to famous artists such as French sculptor Auguste Rodin in creating high quality numbered glass dome snow globes.

Contents 

Initially snow globes consisted of a heavy lead glass dome which was placed over a ceramic figure or tableau on a black cast ceramic base, filled with water and then sealed. The snow or "flitter" was created by use of  bone chips or pieces of porcelain, sand or even sawdust. As they became more sophisticated, the glass became thinner, the bases were lighter (Bakelite was popular during the Art Deco period) and the snow was made out of particles of gold foil or non-soluble soap flakes. For health and safety reasons, white plastic has become more common in the construction of modern snow globes. The liquid has evolved from initially light oil to a mixture of water, antifreeze (ethylene glycol), and glycerol. An added benefit was that glycerol slowed the descent of the snow.

Embellishments
Today's snow globes can include music boxes, moving parts, internal lights, and even electric motors that make the "snow" move so that it is no longer necessary to shake the globe. Some also have central slots for positioning items such as photographs.

Forced-air globes
In 2005, many U.S. stores started to sell inflatable snow globes as part of their Christmas décor. These have a base with a blower, forcing air which carries polystyrene pellets from the bottom and through a tube up the back to the top, where they are blown out and fall down inside the front, which is made of transparent vinyl. The rest of the globe, including the characters inside, are made of colorful nylon fabric. These globes are typically large decorations for the front yard, and are lighted internally with a few C7 (nightlight-type) incandescent light bulbs (which are enclosed in plastic spheres to prevent heat damage to the fabric).

A variation on this is the "tornado globe", where small foam objects spin around inside a globe. This is more common for Halloween, where foam bats or sometimes ghosts may fly around the Halloween figures in the middle. These were most common in 2006, and come in both large inflatables, and smaller tabletop versions with rigid plastic globes about 8 to 12 inches or 20 to 30 centimeters in diameter. As with the snow globes, static cling often causes the foam to stick to the plastic (especially vinyl) when humidity is low, while condensation will do the same thing on outdoor inflatables when humidity is high, or rainwater has seeped in while it is deflated.

Cultural references

In modern culture, snow globes often symbolize childhood, innocence, or so-called "happy days". However, they are also sometimes used, with dark humor, to evoke more gruesome scenes.

Film 
 The film Citizen Kane (1941) starts with Charles Foster Kane in a bed holding a snow globe, uttering, "Rosebud ..."; the globe slips from his dying hand and smashes. The film historian Paul Malcolm noted the scattered content of the snow globe parallels the scattered or "dispersed" story of Kane to come in the film.
 In the 1994 film The Santa Clause, Charlie Calvin receives a magical snow globe from Head Elf Bernard. When the globe is shaken, a reindeer-pulled sleigh magically flies through the miniature neighborhood inside. The snow globe later serves as a plot element when Charlie shows its magic to his father Scott, helping him to remember his childhood belief in Santa Claus and realize that he truly is Santa. At the end of the film, it is revealed by Bernard that the globe—when shaken—can summon Scott back to visit whenever Charlie wants to see him. The globe makes a cameo in The Santa Clause 2, and features prominently in The Santa Clause 3 in which it is revealed to be connected to the titular escape clause.
 The special edition VHS release of Fargo (1996) included a snow globe which, when shaken, stirred up both snow and "blood".
 In the film Unfaithful (2002), Edward Sumner (Richard Gere) uses the snow globe he gave as a present to his wife Connie (Diane Lane) as a weapon to kill her lover Paul Martel (Olivier Martinez).
 In the film Snowglobe (2007), a magical snow globe transports the protagonist to a world where the spirit of Christmas persists.
 In the film Coraline, based on a novel by Neil Gaiman, Coraline's parents are imprisoned in a souvenir snow globe of the Detroit Zoo.
 Pixar's early short film Knick Knack (1989) is about a snow globe snowman trying to break out of his globe.

Publications
 In Libba Bray's book Going Bovine (2009), snow globes are used periodically as metaphors for the constraints of reality and life as we know it. At the end of the book, the main characters smash them, claiming that they are "freeing the snow globes".
In Erica Rand's The Ellis Island Snow Globe (2005), a snow globe from the Ellis Island gift shop is one of the objects that "demonstrate how some narratives are promoted while others are repressed to represent a particular version of United States history and citizenship."

Television
 The British TV BBC comedy series, The League of Gentlemen often featured snow globes throughout its run, integral to the show's plot at times.
 The series finale of St. Elsewhere famously ends with the implication that the events of the whole series were nothing more than a mere fantasy imagined by Tommy Westphall, an autistic boy whose most treasured possession is a snow globe containing a small model of a building resembling the hospital in which the series is set.
 In the "Small World" episode of Sons of Anarchy (season 5), Jax forms an alliance with Damon Pope and détente among SAMCRO, "black" (the One-Niners), "brown" (the Mayans), and "yellow" (the Triad). Jax then tasks Tig with finding a pipe with which to kill the prison guard who had facilitated the fatal beating by other prisoners of Jax's childhood friend Opie, at Stockton, and who had said the guards were betting on how long it would take Opie to die. Tig can't find a pipe, and instead hands Jax a hammer and a musical "It's a Small World" snow globe. Jax chooses the globe and winds it up; he, Tig, and Chibs slowly circle round the guard as in the ride, and then Jax beats the guard to death with the globe, all while the globe tinkles the song "It's a Small World (After All)".

Art
 The works of Walter Martin & Paloma Muñoz also known as Martin & Muñoz, are often snow globes.

See also 

 Glass paperweight

References

Christmas traditions
Glass applications
Collecting
Winter traditions
Traditional toys
Christmas decorations
Novelty items
Visual arts
Articles containing video clips
Snow